Stephen Peter Wright (born 16 June 1959) is an English former professional footballer who played in the Football League as a defender.

References

1959 births
Living people
People from Clacton-on-Sea
English footballers
Association football defenders
Colchester United F.C. players
Braintree Town F.C. players
Wrexham A.F.C. players
Torquay United F.C. players
Crewe Alexandra F.C. players
Rhyl F.C. players
Chelmsford City F.C. players
Wivenhoe Town F.C. players
English Football League players
Helsingin Jalkapalloklubi players
Harwich & Parkeston F.C. players